Pasquale Mazzocchi (born 27 July 1995) is an Italian professional footballer who plays as a right-back for  club Salernitana and the Italy national team.

Club career
Mazzocchi made his Serie C debut for Pro Piacenza on 31 August 2014, in a game against Grosseto.

On 9 July 2018, he signed a four-year contract with Serie B club Perugia.

On 25 January 2022, Mazzocchi joined Serie A side Salernitana on loan from league rivals Venezia with a conditional obligation to buy.

International career
On 17 September 2022, Mazzocchi received his first Italy national team callup, as manager Roberto Mancini named him to be part of the squad for the UEFA Nations League games against England and Hungary. He made his debut against Hungary in a 2–0 win.

References

External links
 

Living people
1995 births
Italian footballers
Footballers from Naples
Association football fullbacks
Italy international footballers
Serie A players
Serie B players
Serie C players
Serie D players
A.C. Bellaria Igea Marina players
Rimini F.C. 1912 players
Parma Calcio 1913 players
A.C. Perugia Calcio players
Venezia F.C. players
U.S. Salernitana 1919 players